Agios Amvrosios is a small village located in the Limassol District of Cyprus, northwest of the city of Limassol, near the village of Pachna.

External links
Official website

References

Communities in Limassol District